Andre A. "Andy" Martel (December 16, 1946 – December 22, 2016) was an American businessman and politician.

Born in Manchester, New Hampshire, Martel graduated from Bishop Bradley High School in 1964 and New Hampshire College (now Southern New Hampshire University) in 1971. Martel also took graduate classes at Emerson College, Wellesley College, Cornell University, and Princeton University. He worked in various businesses as a general manager and auditor. Martel served in the New Hampshire House of Representatives from 1998 to 2002 and from 2012 until his death and served in the New Hampshire State Senate for the 18th district from 2002 to 2006. He was a Republican. Martel died at Catholic Medical Center in Manchester, New Hampshire.

Notes

1946 births
2016 deaths
Politicians from Manchester, New Hampshire
Southern New Hampshire University alumni
Emerson College alumni
Wellesley College alumni
Cornell University alumni
Princeton University alumni
Businesspeople from New Hampshire
Republican Party members of the New Hampshire House of Representatives
Republican Party New Hampshire state senators
20th-century American businesspeople